The Economy of the Empire of Japan refers to the period in Japanese economic history in Imperial Japan that began with the Meiji Restoration in 1868 and ended with the Surrender of Japan in 1945 at the end of World War II. It was characterized by a period of rapid industrialization in the late nineteenth and early twentieth centuries, and the dominance of a wartime economy from 1938–1945.

The proto-industrial base 

The Tokugawa Japan during a long period of “closed country” autarky between the mid-seventeenth century and the 1850s has achieved a high level of urbanization; well-developed road networks; the channeling of river water flow with embankments and the extensive elaboration of irrigation ditches that supported and encouraged the refinement of rice cultivation based upon improving seed varieties, fertilizers and planting methods especially in the Southwest with its relatively long growing season; the development of proto-industrial (craft) production by merchant houses in the major cities like Osaka and Edo and its diffusion to rural areas after 1700; and the promotion of education and population control among both the military elite (the samurai) and the well-to-do peasantry in the eighteenth and early nineteenth centuries.

At the time, Japan’s agricultural productivity was high enough to sustain substantial craft (proto-industrial) production in both rural and urban areas of the country prior to industrialization.

Fukoku Kyohei: 1868–1887

Policies 

The official government entities that guided the Japanese national economy were the Economy and Finance Ministry, the Bank of Japan, and the Industry and Commerce Ministry. For military spending, there was the Navy Ministry and the Ministry of the Army.

Domestic investment 

Domestic investment in industry and infrastructure was the driving force behind growth in Japanese output. Both private and public sectors invested in infrastructure, national and local governments serving as coordinating agents for infrastructure build-up.

Finance

Private Banking 

The Ministry of Finance created the Bank of Japan in 1882, laying the foundations for a private banking system backed up a lender of last resort.

The Noguchi Family made their principal investments in banking, commerce, and industry in Korea during the Japanese occupation. With their funds, the zaibatsu and the Japanese government founded the Bank of Chosen, the central banking institution in the province, which was linked with the Central Bank of Manchou.

Infrastructure and Manufacturing Expand: 1887–1938

Infrastructure

Monies

Industrial sector

Naval construction 
In 1893 naval construction was in the range 177,000 to 1,528,000 tonnes. In 1913 this increased to 3,565,000 tonnes. In 1924 with 237 500-tonnes vessels and 11 10,000-tonnes and reaching 4,140,000 tonnes in 1928. The Japanese Navy was third in the world behind British and American Navies and dominated the West Pacific area before the war. The first modern Shipyard was built in 1891, and since then naval construction rapidly advanced. Japanese boats of more than 100 tonnes represented a total registered tonnage of 5,007,000 tonnes out of 1,198,000 corresponding to naval construction of 1936–1938. This put Japan in third place between maritime powers, a notable realization in such a short time. The old vessels were destroyed or disarmed which is why the regular fleet was efficient and modern. Without a scarcity of petrol at the time, many of these modern vessels were designed for that energy source.

Military industry 

Navy: Aichi, Kawanishi, Showa/Nakajima, Nihon, Maeda, Yokosuka, Watanabe, Kyūshū, Kugisho, Mizuno, and Funryu.
Army: Nikkoku, Yokoi, Maeda, Rikugun/Kokukosho, Rikugun/Kogiken, Tachikawa, Kawasaki, Kokusai, and Kayaba.
Both: Nakajima, Mitsubishi
Manchukuo: Manshū and other related companies.

Forestry 
Local forestry represented a production of 14,000,000 meters of wood with a value of ¥75,000,000, a total value of ¥50,000,000 in cut wood, ¥3,000,000 in bamboo and other secondary wood products for a total value of ¥100,000,000. The local forests covered 200,000 km2, 90,000 km2 under State administration or Imperial Family reserves. And, taking part in scientific forest research during the latter years. Coal of wood was valued at 100,000,000 yen. Sugi (Cryptomeria) represented a quarter of the total quantity, Pine more than 20% in quantity and value and the Hinoki (Chamaecyparis Obtusa) only 1/4% of quantity, but more than 9% in value.

Despite many forests and their importance, Japan continued to buy wood overseas. In accordance with the other dates, Japan had 200,000 km2 of forest, 100,000 km2 in private hands, the other 75,000 km2 in state control and 12,000 km2 owned by the Imperial House. Wood exports were made to the rest of the Japanese empire and to foreign markets.

Paper and cellulose industry 
Since ancient times, Japan has manufactured assorted paper types by hand. A modern mechanized industry appeared in 1872 and became one of the most important industries in the nation. The total production was about 1,000,000 tonnes of paper and cardboard. cellulose paste, the principal prime material, was made in Shikoku, Hokkaidō and Karafuto. The Cellulose production resulted in 8% of U.S. manufacture; the Cellulose industry in Japan developed in Shikoku, North Honshū, Hokkaidō, Chosen, Manchukuo and Karafuto. In Karafuto was the Shiretoru Cellulose Factory, the most advanced installation dedicated to the cellulose industry in all of East Asia. The first place where European-type paper was manufactured in Japan was in the city of Shikuka. Additionally, to complement this local production, these products were sold in Canada and the United States of America.

Fishing 

The important Okhotsk fisheries had a value of ¥50 million. Other fisheries in Chosen, Karafuto, South Mandate and Formosa came to ¥122,000,000 and ¥358,000,000 from Japan proper, for a total of ¥480,000,000 (1938 figures). Secondary products from fishing had a value of ¥150 million to ¥200 million. (From another source, fishing values were of ¥235,000,000 and ¥275,000,000 from 1919 to 1913, more than the British.)

In 1932, Japan invested $550,000,000 in Korea, along with $320,000,000 in 1938. This investment produced a return of 400% in industrial monetary value. In the fishing industry, Japan extracted a value of $20,000,000 annually, comprising 15% of world fishing volumes at the time.

Coastal fishing represented 61% of the total value, with a fleet of 364,260 small boats, of which 20% had engines; the rest were sailing boats. High seas fishing represented 28% of the industry, with whaling, coral and pearl collecting and pisciculture on land making up the rest. The high seas vessels operated in the North Pacific area (Alaska coasts), to the South Pacific. During Japanese administration, the fishing in the Kwantung leased territory was 61,000 tonnes.

In 1938, the fish factory vessels packed 204,000,000 packages of crab and 370 packages of sea salmon. In the same year, four whale hunting vessels fished in the waters around the Antarctic. Factories were built in Chisima, Hokkaidō, Karafuto, Taiwan, Chosen, Kyūshū, Shikoku and other coastal areas to process fish products.

The Japanese and Russian oil wells, in the same oil zone, were strictly controlled to ensure equitable exploitation. The pits stayed in direct connection with the Moskalvo port on the west coast of Ohka through a network of oil pipelines.

In 1925, the Soviet Government granted Japan petroliferous and carbonaceous concessions in North Sakhalin to Mitsubishi, Itoh-Korada, Mitsui and other Japanese Companies for a period of 45 years. By Protocols and agreements signed in Moscow in May 1944, these concessions expired 26 years before the accorded time in 1970, while a new Japanese-Russian accord over fishing conventions agreed to the formal retirement of some Japanese fisheries in the Far East to Japanese concessors, the right of Soviet Organizations to buy annually and for auction 10% of Japanese fish shares, and a supplementary payment in gold for Japanese owners.

When modifying these fishing conventions in 1928, according to the activities of Soviet Fishing Organizations, citizens were subject to substantial reductions. The Japanese-Russian accord of March 1944 cancelled all restrictions previously observed.

Japanese subjects and foreigners were banned from fishing in certain maritime zones in the Far East under an agreement made with the Soviet Government in July 1941. The Japanese Government also guaranteed that fishing rights on the East Coast of Kamchatka and Olyutorsk were not taken up by the Japanese.

Others 

Other significant industries were chemicals (30%) along with metal and machinery (10%) with a total 1,000,000 of workers in these areas, plus woodworking, textiles, foods, and handicrafts.

Wartime Economy: 1938–1945

Use of occupied territories 

From 1937, during the Japanese military occupation of territories in China, they controlled certain mineral deposits in those areas. They fall into three sectors:

Deposits of tungsten, tin and manganese, also.
Zhejiang: coal reserves were 101 million tonnes and extraction 250,000 tonnes in 1934. There were certain soils rich in bauxite.
Fujian: coal reserves of 500 million tonnes in 1934.
Guangdong: 421 million tonnes of coal reserves and production was 338,000 tonnes in 1934. Iron reserves in Hainan, with 400 million tonnes of iron of high grade in 1934. A small tungsten production, also.
Guangxi: coal reserves of 300 million tonnes, and production of 30,000 tonnes in 1940. There were some sources of tungsten, manganese (production of 1,246 tonnes in 1940) and a tin production of 417,000 tonnes too.
Hunan: coal reserves were 1,793 million tonnes and extraction of 1,050,000 tonnes in 1940. Some deposits of tungsten, mercury, antimony (Hsikwangshan mine), manganese and gold.
Guizhou: coal reserves were 1,549 million tonnes, and extraction 360,750 tonnes in 1940. Deposits of mercury, copper, antimony, and sulphur also.

Military occupation of South East Asia by Japanese forces added further resources and strategic locations.

Burma: in the Irrawaddy river zone, there were the Yenangyaung and Chauk oil fields, 300 miles (500 km) north of Rangoon. These sources and other in Singu extracted 260,000,000 gallons in 1938, and there was an unexploited coal deposit. This nation had other minerals: amber and jade (nefrite stone), lapis lazuli, lazurite, rubies, extraction  in 1937, sapphires, etc. in Shan Mesete. There was a major mine in Bawdwin, producing silver, lead, zinc, nickel and copper. This deposit produced 72,000 tonnes of lead and ones 5,000,000 ounces in 1933, rock with content 20% of lead and zinc as a mineral. In Mergui and Tavoy (Tenasserin area) mines produced tungsten and tin from 1910. Tin extraction rose to 6,623 tonnes in 1937.
Thailand: in its ranges were abundant sources of tin, which were extracted for mining, and from rivers. On the south coast guano was mined for fertilizer production.
French Indochina: in Honggay (near Haipong) extracted ones 2,308,000 tonnes of coal in 1937. Minerals included Tungsten, Chromium, Tin, antimony and manganese in the northern area and Phosphate rock in the southern area. These minerals were extracted to export in bulk for processing abroad.
Malacca: Tin extraction was in the hands of its Chinese citizens; production in 1939 was 55,950 tonnes or some 30% of world production. There were tin factories in Singapore and Penang for processing local extractions, and those of Thailand, Burma and Indochina. In the same area, Japanese pre-war investment had related to bauxite, iron and manganese. The Kelantan, Trengganu and Johore iron mineral extractions represented 1,944,701 tonnes in 1939; the manganese was from Kelantan and Trengganu and Bauxite provided from Johore in the same year. Other Japanese mining investments were in the Dutch island of Bintang and existing coal deposits.
Dutch Indies: Its minerals were scarce but had important value. The oil in the Palembang (Sumatra), Djambi, Medan and Borneo fields in Balikpapan and Tarakan produced 7,938,000 tonnes in 1940; perhaps a greater yield than California and Iran. Coal was in Sumatra and Borneo, with 1,456,647 tonnes mined in the same year. Additionally, there were sulphur and manganese in Java, and nickel in Celebes. Tin came from Banka and the Billington Islands, which extracted 43,900 tonnes in 1940. The Japanese mining business in the Bintang Island tin deposits produced 275,000 tonnes that year, supposedly one sixth of world production.
Philippines: Its mining industry had spectacularly developed during the U.S. administration. It produced more gold than Alaska, or any other American state apart from California. Gold extraction in 1941 represented 1,109,000 troy oz (34,500 kg), five times more than in 1931, and silver associated with gold ore at the same level. These extractions proceeded mostly from the Benget district in Baguio Province, Luzon. Iron deposits were rapidly developed and during 1941 1,191,641 tonnes was exported to Japan. Iron sources were located in North Camarines (Luzon), Samar Island and Surigao in Mindanao island. In the last of these, the iron reserves were estimated as 500 million tonnes; Laterithic minerals with the content of silicon, sulphur, phosphorus, and iron content of 48% were of easy extraction from coastal areas. Chromium was not discovered until 1935, but the Philippines in 1939 produced 164,000 tonnes and had a fifth place, or 11%, of world production. Sources were in Zambales (Luzon) with its extraction of 10 million tonnes, chrome oxide with a high 50% of chrome content. Manganese was abundant but of medium quality, and was sent to the US from 1935; the local production was 58,038 tonnes in 1940. There were also copper, lead, zinc and coal.

In total or partial control:
New Guinea: certain Gold deposits in Bulolo (East New Guinea) with other minerals in these islands.
Nauru: certain sources of phosphates.
Gilberts: are other deposits of phosphates.
Salomon: sources of gold, copper and phosphates.
Palau Islands: Source of bauxite

Due to the great transportation distances, the frequent sinking of Japanese merchant vessels, the downing of transport aircraft, guerrilla and local resistance movements' strikes against mines, centers and transport lines as well as allied aerial attacks against occupied areas and colonial administrative difficulties in managing these large territories outside Japan, the Japanese Empire could not take advantage of these natural resources and many mineral exports were not available to Japanese markets and industries during the Pacific War.

Demography 
In 1914, the Japanese birth rate stood at 15%, close to that of Germany or Russia, slightly lower than Java (Dutch Indies) at 22%. There was a reduction to 13.6% in 1924. For example, in Japan proper there were 157 inhabitants per km2, and HokkaidoHonshu? had 184 residents in per km2 (cf. Java, which had 274).

In 1925, the population grew by 875,000 per year, in 1926 by 900,000, in 1927 this rate increased to 1,000,000 per year. In the next four years, the annual increase in population averaged 900,000, but in 1932–1940 the net growth was more than 1,000,000 per year, a rate which would double the population in 40 years. Japan imported 10% of the food for this population.

In 1936, Japan had 30.3 births per 1,000 residents and 17.5 deaths per 1,000. The net increase in population was 1,028,623 in 1935, but notably reduced to 653,000 in 1939 and 239,000 in 1940. Among the great countries, the birth average of Japan immediately followed British India (34.9) and was double that of the United States (16.7). This was accompanied by a growth in rice production between 1880–1940 of 60 million koku (300 million bushels).

These programs were guided by Katsuko Tojo, General Tojo's wife. She said wives should have seven children and suggested this should be the correct Japanese mother. This included participation by the central government, as she suggested creating one program for increasing the number of marriages.

See also
Agriculture in the Empire of Japan
Demographics of Imperial Japan
Japanese heavy industry during WW2 times
Japanese mining and energy resources (WWII)
Japanese exterior Commerce during WW2 Times
Japanese-German pre-WWII industrial co-operation
Japanese Nuclear Weapons Development
Empire of Japan (foreign commerce and shipping)

References

 JAPAN'S MILITARY AGGRESSION IN EAST ASIA 1931–1937 at users.bigpond.com/battleforaustralia
 Japan's Economic Expansion into Manchuria and China in World War Two at historyorb.com Author: James Graham Published: May, 2004

External links
Why Japan Really Lost The War

Economic history of Japan
Economic history of World War II
Economy